The 2007 McDonald's Burnie International was a professional tennis tournament played on outdoor hard courts. It was the 6th edition of the tournament, and part of the 2007 ATP Challenger Series. It took place in Burnie, Australia, between 3 and 9 December 2007.

Singles main-draw entrants

Seeds

Other entrants
The following players received wildcards into the singles main draw:
  Andrew Roberts
  Miles Armstrong
  Brydan Klein
  Matthew Ebden

The following players received entry from the qualifying draw:
  Kaden Hensel
  Andrew Thomas
  Rubin Statham
  G.D. Jones

Champions

Men's singles

 Alun Jones def.  Rameez Junaid, 3–6, 7–6(7–4), 7–5

Men's doubles

 Sam Groth /  Joseph Sirianni def.  Nima Roshan /  Rubin Statham, 6–3, 1–6, [10–4]

External links

2007 ATP Challenger Series
2007 in Australian tennis
2007 McDonald's Burnie International